George Wolfe Plank (1883–1965) was an American artist illustrator, chiefly remembered for his long-term association with Vogue Magazine, which resulted in years of covers in an Art Deco style related to that of Helen Dryden and influenced by, among others, Edmund Dulac.

Style Plank's work has been compared with such artists as Rackham, Dulac, Alphonse Mucha and even Gustav Klimt. His work is characterized by broad fields of bright colour setting off the mass and line of his principal figures. His composition is clear and simple, the wealth of sartorial detail notwithstanding. Plank broke onto the Vogue scene with his mature style almost completely established and worked for some years with no real rivals before Helen Dryden's work matured and she became one of the most important of his colleagues. William Packer described Plank's concept of fashion as "ideal, bizarre and improbable, at once adventurous and yet romantic and nostalgic".

External links
 George Plank Papers. Yale Collection of American Literature, Beinecke Rare Book and Manuscript Library.
 Article on Wolfe and E.F. Benson - https://www.tandfonline.com/doi/abs/10.1080/14714787.2017.1317017?journalCode=rvcb20
 http://www.condenaststore.com/-st/George-Wolfe-Plank-Prints_c146888_.htm

1883 births
1965 deaths
American magazine illustrators